A Life for a Life is a 1910 silent film short directed by Edward R. Phillips. It was produced by released through the Vitagraph Company of America.

The film survives in the Library of Congress collection.

Cast
Adele DeGarde -

References

1910 films
American black-and-white films
American silent short films
1910 short films
Vitagraph Studios short films
1910s American films